Puya reducta is a species in the genus Puya. This species is endemic to Bolivia.

References

reducta
Flora of Bolivia